Lolotique is a municipality in the San Miguel department of El Salvador. 

Municipalities of the San Miguel Department (El Salvador)